Joseph Anton Marty (September 1, 1913 – October 4, 1984) was an American centerfielder in Major League Baseball.

A native of Sacramento, California, Marty was a teammate of Joe DiMaggio when they played for the 1934 and 1935 San Francisco Seals, and was the 1936 Pacific Coast League batting average champion.

He was the first Chicago Cubs player to homer in a night game, which he did on July 1, 1938 while playing at Cincinnati. He drove in 5 of the 9 runs in the Cubs' 1938 World Series loss to the New York Yankees. His .500 batting average (6-for-12) led all Yankees and Cubs regulars in the series, although he did not appear in Game 1. On October 8, 1938, in Game 3, Marty's solo home run was the first home run hit in a World Series game by a native Sacramentan.

Over 5 seasons, in 538 games, Marty posted a .261 batting average (478-1832) with 223 runs scored, 44 home runs and 222 RBIs. His career fielding percentage was .972.

He left baseball in 1941 to join the military; after his military service, he opened a popular restaurant in Sacramento on Broadway. After his death in Sacramento in 1984, the restaurant continued operation under new ownership, until a fire destroyed the building on June 25, 2005. The building was destroyed, but much of the memorabilia was saved.

Marty graduated from Christian Brothers High School.

References

Sources

 
 New York Times obituary
 City of Sacramento press release

1913 births
1984 deaths
Major League Baseball center fielders
Chicago Cubs players
Philadelphia Phillies players
Baseball players from Sacramento, California
Sacramento Solons managers
Saint Mary's Gaels baseball players